The 2002 Buffalo Funds - NAIA Division I men's basketball tournament was held in March at Municipal Auditorium in Kansas City, Missouri. This was the first NAIA tournament back in Kansas City since 1993. The NAIA headquarters also relocated to Olathe, Kansas this year.
The 65th annual NAIA basketball tournament featured 32 teams playing in a single-elimination format. The 2002 champion was 2001's runner-up, University of Science and Arts of Oklahoma. The Drovers faced Sooner Athletic Conference rival Oklahoma Baptist University in the championship game. It was the first time two teams from the Sooner Athletic Conference ever met in the national championship game. And the first SAC team to win the tournament since Oklahoma City University won in 1996.  The Drovers rolled over the Bison 96–79. Finishing out the NAIA Semifinals were Azusa Pacific University and Barat College.

2002 was also the first year Buffalo Funds, a Kansas City-based investment management firm, was the title corporate sponsor. In 2008 Buffalo Funds extended its contract with the NAIA tournament until the 2010 tournament; in 2013, it would be extended to 2017.

Awards and honors 
Leading scorer: DuJuan Brown, Oklahoma Baptist (2001 winner) in 5 games DuJuan scored 51FG 21FT totaling 136pts (avg 27.2/game)
Leading rebounder: Sidney Holmes, Barat in 4 games 49 rebounds (avg. 12.3)
Most Three-Point Field Goals Made (All Tournament): 55, USAO (120 attempts)
Most consecutive tournament appearances: 11th, Georgetown (KY)
Most tournament appearances: Georgetown (KY), 21st of 28, appearances to the NAIA Tournament

2002 NAIA bracket

  * denotes overtime.

See also
2002 NAIA Division I women's basketball tournament
2002 NCAA Division I men's basketball tournament
2002 NCAA Division II men's basketball tournament
2002 NCAA Division III men's basketball tournament
2002 NAIA Division II men's basketball tournament

References

NAIA Men's Basketball Championship
Tournament
NAIA Division I men's basketball tournament
NAIA Division I men's basketball tournament